The Ürümqi-Dzungaria railway or Wuzhun railway is a single-track railway line in Xinjiang, China, between Ürümqi, the regional capital of Xinjiang, and the coal fields of the eastern Junggar Basin (Dzungaria). The line opened in 2009 and was built primarily to carry coal.

At its northern end, the line meets the Altay–Fuyun–Zhundong railway.

Passenger services
On 12 July 2019, a passenger service was introduced between Ürümqi railway station, Weijiaquan, and Zhundong.

See also

 List of railways in China

References

Railway lines in China
Rail transport in Xinjiang
Railway lines opened in 2009